The following article is a list of schools of the Conseil scolaire Viamonde (CSV). Conseil scolaire Viamonde is a public French first language secular school board located in Ontario, Canada. It manages public daycares, elementary, and secondary schools in the Ontario Peninsula, an area made of Southwestern Ontario, and most of the Greater Golden Horseshoe

List of institutions 

CSV elementary and secondary schools are organized by which county/single-tier/upper-tier municipalities they are located in.

See also
List of schools in the Conseil scolaire catholique MonAvenir
List of schools in the Toronto Catholic District School Board
List of schools in the Toronto District School Board

Notes

References

External links
 Find a school 

Conseil scolaire Viamonde
Conseil scolaire Viamonde